Maria Antonietta Loi (born 4 May 1973) is an Italian physicist who is a Professor of Optoelectronics at the University of Groningen and member of the Zernike Institute for Advanced Materials. Her research considers the development of functional materials for low-cost, high efficiency photovoltaics. She was awarded the 2018 Netherlands Physical Society Physics prize (Physicaprijs). In 2020, she was elected Fellow of the American Physical Society. Loi is Deputy Editor of Applied Physics Letters.

Early life and education 
Loi was born in Quartu Sant'Elena, Sardinia. She studied physics at the University of Cagliari. She was awarded honours for her undergraduate degree in 1997, before embarking upon a doctoral research program. After earning her PhD she moved to the Johannes Kepler University Linz, where she worked as a postdoctoral researcher on organic solar cells. After one year in Austria she returned to Italy, where she joined the Italian National Research Council Institute for Nanostructured Materials.

Research and career 
In 2006, Loi was appointed Assistant Professor at the University of Groningen, and awarded a Rosalind Franklin Fellowship. Her early work considered the development of carbon nanotubes for photonics devices. She was made Chair of the Department of OptoElectronics in 2011, and Full Professor in 2014.

Loi's research considers the development of hybrid nanomaterials. In particular, she has explored perovskites for solar cells and X-ray detectors. She has shown that Sn-based perovskites have good optical and electronic properties and high charge carrier mobilities. At the same time, the perovskites show photoluminescence from hot-carriers with long lifetimes.

Awards and honours 
 2011 Minerva Prize
 2013 European Research Council Starting Grant
 2013 Elected to AcademiaNet
 2018 Physica Prize 
 2020 Elected Fellow of the American Physical Society
 2022 European Research Council Advanced Grant
 2022 Elected Member of the Royal Netherlands Academy of Arts and Sciences

Selected publications

References 

1973 births
Italian women physicists
Fellows of the American Physical Society
Living people
Members of the Royal Netherlands Academy of Arts and Sciences